Theodorus Jacobus Leonardus "Dick" Quax (1 January 1948 – 28 May 2018) was a Dutch-born New Zealand runner, one-time world record holder in the 5000 metres, and local-body politician.

Quax stood for Parliament for the ACT Party in 1999 and 2002. He was a Manukau City councillor from 2001 to 2007, when he stood unsuccessfully for mayor, and was a councillor on the Auckland Council from 2011 until his death in 2018.

Athletic career 
Quax won four New Zealand national athletics titles: the 5000 m in 1972, 1973, and 1974; and the one mile in 1969.

At the 1970 British Commonwealth Games, Quax won the silver medal in the 1500 metres. In the 5000 m, at the 1972 Summer Olympics he was eliminated in the heats, but he won silver in 1976. He did not compete in 1980 in Moscow due to the West's boycott.

In 1977 at Stockholm Quax set a world record of 13:12.9 in the 5000 m. This record stood for less than a year, but as a national record it stood for over 31 years, until beaten by Adrian Blincoe in July 2008.

Early in 1980 at Stanford Stadium Quax missed Jos Hermens' 15 km world record by five seconds, running a New Zealand national record of 43:01.7. In his later career Quax switched his focus to the marathon, running 2:11.13 in his debut for 4th place at the Nike OTC Marathon in 1979, at that time the fastest debut marathon in history. In 1980 he returned and won the race in a New Zealand record time of 2:10.47. After retiring from competition, Quax established a career in sports management.  He also coached his son, Theo, the New Zealand U18 and U20 Champion  for 1500 m.

Personal bests

Political career 
He was ranked 11th on the ACT party list, which was too low to be elected from the list, as only the first 9 candidates got returned. He stood again in the 2002 general election.

In October 2001 Quax was elected to the Manukau City Council for the Pakuranga ward and was re-elected in 2004 to represent the new Botany-Clevedon ward after a failed bid for the Manukau City mayoralty. On 13 October 2007 Quax lost his bid to become mayor of Manukau City to Len Brown by 14,000 votes.

During this election, Quax complained to the electoral office over an "offensive flyer" depicting him and members of his People's Choice party as the Thunderbirds. His complaint was not upheld as there was no evidence to suggest who had posted the flyers.

Quax stood for Citizens & Ratepayers in the 2010 Auckland Council elections, losing to Jami-Lee Ross by 253 votes. In 2011 Quax was elected to the council after a by-election was held in Howick due to Ross resigning after becoming a Member of Parliament. He was re-elected unopposed in 2013.

During the 2013 Len Brown mayoral scandal, Quax took the opportunity for political payback against Brown, leading the call for him to resign for not declaring hotel upgrades as gifts. It emerged that Quax had also not filed returns on the gifts he had received during the previous term.

Quax was re-elected in the 2016 Auckland elections.

In his tenure as councilor, he opposed high density housing and public transportation, and supported selling Auckland's council-owned water and wastewater supplier Watercare Services. While originally opposing the council's proposed Unitary Plan, Quax later supported the plan in full. Quax was described by The New Zealand Herald as "right wing".

"Quaxing" 
Quax tweeted in January 2015 about his disbelief that anyone in the Western world would go shopping by means of "walking, cycling, or public transit." Twitter users responded by creating the hashtag "#quaxing". The Public Address website voted "quaxing" as its word of the year 2015, followed by "Red Peak" and "twitterati".

Personal life 
Quax and his family arrived in New Zealand from the Netherlands on 10 October 1954. According to an interview in the New Zealand Listener the family had travelled on the same ship as former Race Relations Commissioner Joris de Bres. Quax became a naturalised New Zealander in 1969.

Quax married three times, his third marriage being to Roxanne in August 1991. He had three children, with Theo being on the NAU Lumberjacks cross country team.

Illness and death 
It was revealed on 27 November 2013 that Quax had been undergoing treatment for throat cancer, which had been diagnosed two months earlier.

Quax died of cancer in Auckland on 28 May 2018, aged 70.

References

External links 
 
 

|-

1948 births
2018 deaths
Dutch emigrants to New Zealand
Olympic athletes of New Zealand
Olympic silver medalists for New Zealand
New Zealand male middle-distance runners
New Zealand male long-distance runners
Athletes (track and field) at the 1972 Summer Olympics
Athletes (track and field) at the 1976 Summer Olympics
Athletes (track and field) at the 1970 British Commonwealth Games
Athletes (track and field) at the 1978 Commonwealth Games
Commonwealth Games silver medallists for New Zealand
Sportspeople from Alkmaar
New Zealand sportsperson-politicians
ACT New Zealand politicians
Auckland Councillors
Commonwealth Games medallists in athletics
Manukau City Councillors
Unsuccessful candidates in the 1999 New Zealand general election
Unsuccessful candidates in the 2002 New Zealand general election
People educated at Hamilton Boys' High School
Deaths from throat cancer
Medalists at the 1976 Summer Olympics
Olympic silver medalists in athletics (track and field)
21st-century New Zealand politicians
New Zealand male cross country runners
Naturalised citizens of New Zealand
Deaths from cancer in New Zealand
Medallists at the 1970 British Commonwealth Games